The Time Magazine Quality Dealer Award (TMQDA) is an annual Time Magazine-sponsored award, in partnership with Ally Financial, honoring new-car dealers in America who exhibit exceptional performance in their dealerships and perform distinguished community service. It is the automobile industry's most prestigious and coveted award for car dealerships. Dealers are nominated by members of the Automotive Trade Association Executives (ATAE). Finalists and winners are chosen by a panel of faculty members from the University of Michigan's Tauber Institute for Global Operations. The "TIME Magazine Dealer of the Year" award is presented at the annual National Automobile Dealers Association (NADA) convention.

National TIME Dealer of the Year Winners

1960s
 1960 — W. Bankston
 1961 — John Landers
 1962 — Richard Stoudt, Sr.
 1963 — I. Burton (I.G. Burton Company, Inc. in Milford, Delaware)
 1964 — Charles Medick
 1965 — Herb Abramson (Chestnut Hill, Massachusetts)
 1966 — George Higgins
 1967 — 
 1968 — C. Thomas
 1969 — William Rohrer

1970s
 1970 — O. Noller
 1971 — Nicholas Lattof
 1972 — Roy Butler (Coors of Austin in Austin, Texas)
 1973 — Harmon Born (Beaudry Ford, Inc. in Atlanta, Georgia)
 1974 — Rolland Patterson (Rancho Mirage, California)
 1975 — W. Cook
 1976 — Frank England, Jr. (England Motor Company in Greenville, Mississippi)
 1977 — Warren McEleney (McEleney Motors, Inc. in Clinton, Iowa) and Robert Rice (Bob Rice Ford Inc. in Boise, Idaho)
 1978 — Edward Glockner (Glockner Chevrolet in Portsmouth, Ohio)
 1979 — John Pohanka (Pohanka Oldsmobile-GMC, Inc. in Marlow Heights, Maryland)

1980s
 1980 — Edward Rikess (Scottsdale, Arizona)
 1981 — Ray Shepherd (Ray Shepherd Motors, Inc. in Fort Scott, Kansas)
 1982 — Richard Strauss (Richmond, Virginia)
 1983 — John Cooper
 1984 — James Willingham (Boulevard Buick-Pontiac- GMC Truck in Long Beach, California)
 1985 — H.F. Boeckmann, II (Galpin Motors, Inc. in North Hills, California)
 1986 — Joshua Darden (Colonial Chevrolet in Norfolk, Virginia)
 1987 — Bob Russell (Russell Chevrolet Co. in Sherwood, Arkansas)
 1988 — Sam Pack (Lee Jarmon Ford, Inc. in Carrollton, Texas)
 1989 — Lou Fusz (Lou Fusz Automotive Network in St. Louis, Missouri)

1990s
 1990 — James Lupient (Lupient Oldsmobile-Isuzu-Sterling in Minneapolis, Minnesota)
 1991 — Jack Krenzen (Krenzen Indoor Auto Mall in Duluth, Minnesota)
 1992 — Sheilah Garcia (Garcia Honda in Albuquerque, New Mexico)
 1993 — Richard Fitzpatrick, Jr. (Crest Lincoln-Mercury-Isuzu in Woodbridge, Connecticut)
 1994 — Lorne Schlatter (Quality Motors, Inc. in Independence, Kansas)
 1995 — William Adamson (Adamson Motors, Inc. in Rochester, Minnesota)
 1996 — David Parker (Parker Cadillac Inc. in Little Rock, Arkansas)
 1997 — Talton Anderson (Baxter Auto in Omaha, Nebraska)
 1998 — Dale Critz, Sr. (Critz Auto Group in Savannah, Georgia) and Randy Hansen (Randy Hansen Chevrolet, Inc. in Twin Falls, Idaho)
 1999 — Charlie Zook (Charlie Zook Motors, Inc. in Sioux City, Iowa)

2000s
 2000 — Don Williamson (Moore Buick Pontiac GMC Truck in Jacksonville, North Carolina)
 2001 — Martin NeSmith (NeSmith Chevrolet-Buick-Pontiac-GMC, Inc in Claxton, GA)
 2002 — George Nahas (George Nahas Oldsmobile, Inc. in Tavares, Florida)
 2003 — John Bergstrom (Bergstrom Automotive in Neenah, Wisconsin)
 2004 — Paul Holloway (Dreher Holloway Inc. in Greenland, New Hampshire)
 2005 — Ralph Seekins (Seekins Ford Lincoln Mercury in Fairbanks, Alaska)
 2006 — Bennie F. Ryburn III (Ryburn Motor Company, Inc. in Monticello, Arkansas)
 2007 — Tracy Shields Jones (Century Automotive Group, Inc. in Huntsville, Alabama)
 2008 — Timothy J. Smith (Bob Smith BMW/Mini in Calabasas, California)
 2009 — George P. Fritze (Red River Motor Co. in Bossier City, Louisiana)

2010s
 2010 — Scott H. Wood (Stanley Wood Chevrolet Pontiac Co./Scott Wood Chrysler, Dodge, Jeep in Batesville, Arkansas)
 2011 — Thomas Castriota (Castriota Chevrolet) in Hudson, Florida
 2012 — Mike Shaw (Mike Shaw Chevrolet Saab in Denver, Colorado)
 2013 — Michael Alford (Marine Chevrolet Cadillac in Jacksonville, North Carolina)
 2014 — Jeff Teague (Teague Ford Lincoln in El Dorado, Arkansas)
 2015 — Andy Crews (AutoFair Honda in Manchester, New Hampshire)
 2016 — Mary Catherine Van Bortel (Van Bortel Motorcar Inc. in Victor, New York: Subaru, Chevrolet, Ford)

Source:

See also

 List of motor vehicle awards

References

American awards
Motor vehicle awards
Time (magazine)
Auto dealerships